Mary Howard, of the Holy Cross (28 December 1653 – 21 March 1735 at Rouen) was an English nun of the Poor Clares.

Life
She was a great-granddaughter of Thomas Howard, 4th Duke of Norfolk, and a daughter of Sir Robert Howard, a younger son of Thomas Howard, 1st Earl of Berkshire, in whose home Mary's early youth was spent. At the age of eighteen, to escape the attentions of Charles II of England, she went to Paris, under the assumed name of Talbot, and was placed in the Benedictine convent of Val de Grace to learn French.

Here she was received into the Catholic Church, a step which brought her into disfavour with Lady Osborne, her guardian in Paris. Remaining staunch, she was finally permitted to retire to the convent of the Canonesses of St. Augustine at Chaillot, near Paris, where she remained several years, until her admission into the English convent of Poor Clares at Rouen, under the name of Parnel, to safeguard further the secret of her identity.

Here she was made successively mistress of the choir, second and first portress, the latter a position involving the management of the temporal affairs of the convent, and in 1702, on the resignation of Mother Winefrid Clare Giffard, abbess since 1670, she became abbess of the community.

Works
Her "Chief Points of our Holy Ceremonies " was published in 1726. Her other works, all in manuscript, are chiefly books of spiritual exercises, litanies, and other devotions.

See also

References

Attribution

1653 births
1735 deaths
18th-century English Roman Catholic nuns
Mary of the Holy Cross
17th-century English Roman Catholic nuns